Derek Brenzcewski is the lead character in the TV reality series, Trouble in Paradise, on Spike TV. which initially aired in the fourth quarter of 2014. extolling the drama surrounding a restaurateur from Joliet, Illinois, United States, who takes his staff and family to the country of Antigua-Barbuda to open the Majestic Isle Casino.

The show focuses on the cultural clashes between the fast-paced life of a Chicago based individual, when moving their lives to Antigua and working on "island time."

The show aired initially in November 2014, and is to continue in 2015.

References

External links
Omaha.com

Participants in American reality television series
Living people
Year of birth missing (living people)
Place of birth missing (living people)